The Blair House is a historic house in the city of Montgomery, Ohio, United States.  One of the best examples of Victorian-period Italianate architecture in the city, it was built for butcher James Blair and his wife Anne in 1875.  A brick structure with a slate roof, it is a two-story structure built in the plan of the letter "L."  Among its distinctive architectural elements are the ornamented single-story bay, the brackets that support the eaves of the roof, and the corbelled chimneys.

In 1982, the Blair House was listed on the National Register of Historic Places because of its well-preserved historic architecture.  Its date makes it close to unique; most of the city's remaining nineteenth-century buildings were erected before 1850, and almost no other Victorian structures have survived to the present day.  It is one of five locations in Montgomery that is listed on the Register, along with the Montgomery Saltbox Houses, the Universalist Church Historic District, the Wilder-Swaim House, and the Yost Tavern.

References

Houses in Hamilton County, Ohio
Montgomery, Ohio
Houses completed in 1875
Houses on the National Register of Historic Places in Ohio
National Register of Historic Places in Hamilton County, Ohio
Italianate architecture in Ohio